"Black Bugs" is a song by Australian rock band Regurgitator. The song was released in January 1998 as the second single from the band's second studio album Unit. The single peaked at number 32 in Australia and it also ranked at No. 32 on Triple J's Hottest 100 in 1998. The song peaked at number 88 in the United Kingdom; becoming their first and only song to peak in the top 100 in that country.

Music video

The computer animated music video sees the four members of the band, portrayed as cartoon animals, performing and dancing to the song. It was directed by Regurgitator frontman Quan Yeomans.
 
The music video was nominated for Best Video at the 1998 ARIA Music Awards.

Reception
Nick Stillman from Happy Mag said "'Black Bugs' is the perfect archetype of how to create rock music with a metallic heart […] In a nod to 80s pop, the guitars are wrapped in a sheet of shimmering modulation, and the drums reverberate with digital desolation. There's a curling keyboard solo too and a persistent sampled drum track that ties the whole song together."
 
In 2019, Tyler Jenke from The Brag ranked Regurgitator's best songs, with "Black Bugs" coming it at number 9. Jenke said "'Black Bugs' was something of a timely anthem about being addicted to video games, backed by a computer-generated film clip that made listeners keen to head home, boot up their Nintendo 64, and blast some black bugs."

Track listings

Charts

Release history

References

 

1998 singles
1997 songs
Regurgitator songs
Songs written by Quan Yeomans
Song recordings produced by Magoo (Australian producer)
Warner Music Australasia singles